The Asian and Oceanian Zone is one of the three zones of regional Davis Cup competition in 2009.

In the Asian and Oceanian Zone there are four different groups in which teams compete against each other to advance to the next group.

Format

There will be a Round Robin where the twelve teams will compete in two pools. The winner of each pool will be promoted to the Asia and Oceania Group III in 2010.

Information

Venue: Dhaka, Bangladesh

Surface: Hard – outdoors

Dates: 1–5 April

Participating teams

 
 
 
 
 
 
 
 
 
  (withdrew)
  (withdrew)
  (withdrew)

Pool A

 Vietnam advances to Asia/Oceania Group III in 2010.

Matches

Bahrain vs. Vietnam

Yemen vs. United Arab Emirates

Bahrain vs. United Arab Emirates

Bahrain vs. Yemen

Yemen vs. Vietnam

United Arab Emirates vs. Vietnam

Pool B

 Bangladesh advances to Asia/Oceania Group III in 2010

Matches

Bangladesh vs. Jordan

Qatar vs. Myanmar

Bangladesh vs. Turkmenistan

Jordan vs. Myanmar

Turkmenistan vs. Myanmar

Qatar vs. Jordan

Bangladesh vs. Qatar

Turkmenistan vs. Jordan

Bangladesh vs. Myanmar

Qatar vs. Turkmenistan

External links
Davis Cup draw details

Group IV
Davis Cup Asia/Oceania Zone